Wickham is a rural locality in the local government area of King Island on King Island in Bass Strait, north of Tasmania. The 2016 census determined a population of 9 for the state suburb of Wickham.

Geography
Bass Strait forms the western and northern boundaries.

Road infrastructure
The B25 route (Rocky Point Road / Cape Wickham Road) enters from the south and runs north and west to the village of Wickham, where it turns north and continues to Cape Wickham Lighthouse.

References

King Island (Tasmania)
Towns in Tasmania